Rajeev Kumar Urf Munna Yadav is an Indian politician. He was elected to the Bihar Legislative Assembly from Minapur as the 2015 Member of Bihar Legislative Assembly as a member of the Rashtriya Janata Dal. He defeated BJP candidate Ajay Kumar with huge margin in Bihar Assembly Election, 2015.

References

Bihar MLAs 2015–2020
Bihar MLAs 2020–2025
1967 births
Living people
Rashtriya Janata Dal politicians
People from Muzaffarpur district